The 2011–12 Belgian Hockey League season was the 92nd season of the Belgian Hockey League, the top level of ice hockey in Belgium. Three teams participated in the league, and HYC Herentals won the championship.

Regular season

Final
 Chiefs Leuven - HYC Herentals 0:3 (3:5, 2:7, 1:7)

External links
 Royal Belgian Ice Hockey Federation

Bel
Belgian Hockey League seasons
Bel